Vanguard was an American Thoroughbred racehorse. Ridden by Tom Costello, he won the 1882 Preakness Stakes.

Background

Vanguard was bred in Kentucky by M. H. Stanford. His dam was La Henderson, a daughter of the influential sire Lexington. His father was the leading sire Virgil. He was foaled on March 24th, 1879. Later on, he was sold to George L. Lorillard.

Racing Career

Vanguard raced nine times in his career, winning four. At three years old, he won the Preakness Stakes, ridden by Tom Costello. His overal career earnings were $5,290.

Pedigree

References

Thoroughbred family 4-r
Racehorses bred in Kentucky
Racehorses trained in the United States
1879 racehorse births
Preakness Stakes winners
Byerley Turk sire line